The Battle of Bergama was fought at and near Bergama (ancient Pergamon, now a district center of İzmir Province, Turkey) between the Greek army and forces of the nascent Turkish National Movement (Kuva-yi Milliye) during the Greco-Turkish War of 1919–1922. The Turkish forces pushed the Greek army from Bergama on 15 June, but the town was recaptured on 22 June.

Background 
Following the decisions of the Allied Supreme War Council, on 14 May 1919 the city of Smyrna (İzmir) was occupied by the Greek army. Over the following weeks, the Greek army began expanding its zone of occupation around the city, The Greek occupation immediately faced armed resistance by irregular forces, and was hampered due to political considerations: as the Smyrna Zone was still officially Ottoman territory, Turkish officials remained in place in the civil administration, as well as in the telegraph and railways; censorship was not imposed and allowed the propaganda of the Turkish National Movement to be freely distributed; and the disarming of the civilian population (including demobilized Ottoman soldiers) was prohibited by the Allies. This allowed the Turks to freely recruit and gather arms and ammunition, creating armed groups often directed by discharged Ottoman Army officers.

Greek occupation of Bergama 
On 12 June 1919, it was occupied by a Greek detachment of the 1st Battalion of the 8th Cretan Regiment, a mountain artillery platoon, and a half-company of cavalry, under Major Apostolos Sermakezis. The local kaymakam protested this, as the occupation of the city was not included in the terms agreed between the Ottoman government and the Allies. On the next day, part of the detachment (110 men with a machine-gun squad) was moved to the port town of Dikili, to ensure the supply of the Greek force. On the same day, Sermakezis notified his superior command in Smyrna (1st Infantry Division headquarters under Colonel Nikolaos Zafeiriou) that Turkish forces began assembling around Bergama to attack his position. 

The Turkish forces around Bergama were commanded by Kemal Muratoğlu, the military commander of Soma.  They comprised irregular and a few regular Turkish forces from Soma, Kınık, Balıkesir, Kaşıkçı, Turanlı, Ayvalık and Kozak.

The Greek forces in the town comprised two and a half infantry companies, three machine-gun squads, two mountain guns and the cavalry half-company. They occupied the heights around the town, and particularly the ancient acropolis hill to the northeast ("Old Bergama") and the bridge and aqueduct over the Bakırçay river.

Battle and Greek withdrawal 
The Turkish attack on the town started at 10:00 of 15 June, with attacks on the entire defensive perimeter of the Greek detachment. On the same morning, the guard on the river bridge and a supply column heading to Dikili were also attacked by irregulars; the men of the latter were almost all killed. At the same time, the telegraph lines were cut. Once this became known in Smyrna, Colonel Zafeiriou ordered the 6th Archipelago Regiment (Col. Charalambos Tseroulis) to board ship to Dikili to come to the assistance of the garrison at Bergama. The regiment was embarked at midnight, and arrived at Dikili on the next morning. 

In the meantime, however, the Turkish forces attacking Bergama had been steadily gaining ground, using the hills and woods of the area as cover. At , the northern advance had been contained, but the Greek positions were attacked in the rear by armed locals; in the town, a Greek patrol was shot at from civilian buildings. As a result, Sermakezis left only a few second-line men to guard the barracks and deployed his entire remaining force to defend the perimeter around the town. Most importantly he sent his cavalry force to reinforce the small bridge garrison, and a detachment of 45 men to block the road towards Menemen. The capture of Old Bergama towards the afternoon placed the Greek detachment in jeopardy, and its commander decided to withdraw under cover of night.

The withdrawal began at 21:30, and initially proceeded smoothly, until the noise caused by the pack animals was perceived by the Turks, who began firing in the direction of the Greek column. This caused panic, and the detachment hastily and in great disorder abandoned much of its heavy equipment. The detachment arrived at the bridge, where it was reunited with its cavalry, and towards midnight made for Menemen. Nevertheless, after leaving two companies as a rear guard, the detachment continued its retreat to Menemen. The Greek forces advancing from Dikili towards Bergama likewise withdrew once the abandonment of the town became known.
 
The detachment suffered 1 officer and 9 other ranks dead, 1 officer and 8 other ranks wounded, but also 86 other ranks missing in action. When the Greek forces returned in the area they found most of the missing soldiers mutilated in the outskirts of Bergama.

Aftermath and recapture of Bergama 
The retreating Greek troops from Bergma arrived at Menemen on 22:00 of 16 June. During its retreat, it lost most of the pack animals and their supplies, and was attacked periodically by Turkish cavalry and armed peasants. The detachment faced armed opposition by Ottoman authorities in Memenen itself.

To justify their defeat in Bergama, the Greeks reported exaggerated numbers about the enemy forces to the Allies. They claimed they were attacked by 3,500 men, when in fact only 500 took part in the fighting on the Turkish side.

The events at Bergama were a rude shock to the Greek command, indicating the ability of the Turkish forces to perform coordinated operations that ended the first Greek defeat in the conflict. General Konstantinos Nider at Smyrna ordered the 6th Archipelago Regiment from Dikili and from Menemen a mixed detachment under Col. Mavroudis, comprising the 5th Archipelago Regiment, a cavalry battalion and artillery. After landing at Dikili on the 16th, the 6th Regiment began its march to Bergama on the 18th, and after overcoming some resistance set up camp. At 4:00 on the 19th, both Greek columns began their final march on Bergama. The Greek official history claims that they faced a force about 1,000 strong with 4–6 machine guns, deployed on the heights southwest of the town. 

At around 6:15, the 6th Regiment met the first Turkish resistance at Ralli-Chiflik, which continued until 14:00. In the meantime, however, Col. Tseroulis had sent another column to capture the bridge over the Bakırçay river that clashed with the Turks around noon. A further two companies were sent to cut off the road towards Soma, and these two became engaged in a heavy firefight after 10:00. Nevertheless, by 13:00 Tseroulis managed to capture the heights to the north of the town, thus effectively encircling it, as the Menemen column under Mavroudis arrived at the bridge at 14:00 and united with Tseroulis' men fighting there.

The Turks realizing that they did not possess enough men, weapons and ammunition to engage a bigger force, decided to abandon Bergama and retreat from the town. A small Turkish force of 56 men equipped with a machine gun and commanded by lieutenant Sabri Bey, was given the task to cover the withdrawal. They successfully managed to stall the Greek forces, for a whole day, until all the remaining Turkish troops could evacuate Bergama. The departing Turkish forces looted the town and withdrew to Soma. The Greek troops entered Bergama on the next day, 20 June.

Aftermath 
Fearing that the Greek troops would try to avenge their casualties, like in Menemen, 80.000-100.000 Turkish civilians fled the area around Bergama in the following days.Elias Venezis, in his famous book Number 31328 states that the returning Greek Army belonging to the 4th regiment found around 40 death Greek soldiers and commenced their "Revenge Workshops". He mentions that the skull of the living people (Turks), were slowly cut with the saw and the cutting method is a circle around it. Arms were crushed with weights and eyes were gouged out with whatever tools the Greek soldiers had. He also adds that the Turks were put in huddled in the shack of the Workshop, watching and waiting in line.  In later versions, this part was deleted and revised to only "There was a lot of retaliation then "

References

Sources
 
 
 

1919 in the Ottoman Empire
1919 in Greece
Bergama
June 1919 events
Battles of the Greco-Turkish War (1919–1922)
Bergama